Ida Dorothy Ottley Cottrell (16 July 1902 – 29 June 1957) was an Australian writer. Born in Picton, she contracted infantile paralysis as a child and spent the rest of her life in a wheelchair. Her first novel, The Singing Gold, was published in 1928. She wrote a story Wilderness Orphan (1936) which was the basis for the feature film Orphan of the Wilderness (1936). She lived for a time in the US and also worked as an artist and cartoonist.

Writings
The Singing Gold (1927)
Earth Battle (1927) (US: 
A Little Chapel of Memory (1932 est) Booklet on Mission Inn, Riverside, CA
Winks: His Book (1934)
Wilderness Orphan (1936) - filmed as Orphan of the Wilderness (1936)The Silent Reefs (1953) - filmed as The Secret of the Purple Reef'' (1960)

References

External links
 
Ida Dorothy Ottley Cottrell at Australian Dictionary of Biography
Dorothy Cottrell at Public Memory History Cluster, University of Southern Queensland website
Papers of Dorothy Cottrell at James Cook University Archives
Papers of Dorothy Cottrell at National Library of Australia
Dorothy Cottrell at Design and Art Australia Online
Dorothy Cottrell at Australian Women's Register

20th-century Australian novelists
Australian women novelists
1902 births
1957 deaths
20th-century Australian women writers
20th-century Australian screenwriters